Massimiliano is a masculine Italian given name. Notable people with the name include:

Massimiliano Alajmo (born 1974), Italian chef
Massimiliano Allegri (born 1967), Italian footballer and manager
Massimiliano Ammendola (born 1990), Italian footballer
Massimiliano Barbone (born 1991), Italian footballer
Massimiliano Benassi (born 1981), Italian footballer
Massimiliano Busellato (born 1993), Italian footballer
Massimiliano Soldani Benzi (1656–1740), Italian sculptor and medallist
Massimiliano Blardone (born 1979), Italian alpine skier
Massimiliano Brizzi (born 1975), Italian footballer
Massimiliano Cappellini (born 1971), Italian footballer
Massimiliano Cappioli (born 1968), Italian footballer
Massimiliano Caputo (born 1980), Italian footballer
Massimiliano Capuzzoni (1969–1995), Italian rugby union player
Massimiliano Carletti (born 1973), Italian footballer
Massimiliano Cavalera (born 1969), lead vocalist for Soulfly
Massimiliano Chiamenti (1967–2011), Italian poet and philologist
Massimiliano Donati (born 1979), Italian sprinter
Massimiliano Duran (born 1963), Italian boxer
Massimiliano Eroli (born 1976), Italian swimmer
Massimiliano Esposito (born 1972), Italian footballer
Massimiliano Ferretti (born 1966), Italian water polo player
Massimiliano Frani (born 1967), Italian musician
Massimiliano Frezzato (born 1967), Italian comic book writer
Massimiliano Fuksas (born 1944), Italian architect
Massimiliano Fusani (born 1979), Italian footballer
Massimiliano Giacobbo (born 1974), Italian footballer
Massimiliano Gioni (born 1973), Italian art curator and critic
Massimiliano Lelli (born 1967), Italian cyclist
Massimiliano Marsili (born 1987), Italian footballer
Massimiliano Masin (born 1968), Italian baseball player
Massimiliano Massimo (died 1911), Italian Jesuit
Massimiliano Messieri (born 1964), Italian composer
Massimiliano Mori (born 1974), Italian cyclist
Massimiliano Narducci (born 1964), Italian tennis player
Massimiliano Neri (born 1977), Italian model
Massimiliano Ossari (1977–2002), Italian footballer
Massimiliano Palombara (1614–1680), marquis of Pietraforte and Conservator of Rome
Massimiliano Pedalà (born 1969), Italian racing driver
Massimiliano Pesenti (born 1987), Italian footballer
Massimiliano Romeo (born 1971), Italian politician
Massimiliano Rosa (born 1970), Italian footballer
Massimiliano Rosolino (born 1978), Italian swimmer
Massimiliano Scaglia (born 1977), Italian footballer
Massimiliano Taddei (born 1991), Italian footballer
Massimiliano Tacchinardi (born 1971), Italian footballer
Massimiliano Tagliani (born 1989), Italian footballer
Massimiliano Varricchio (born 1976), Italian footballer
Massimiliano Versace (born 1972), Italian scientist
Massimiliano Zazzetta (born 1979), Italian footballer

See also
Maximilian

Italian masculine given names